Osteichthyes, popularly referred to as the bony fish, is a diverse superclass of vertebrates, that have skeletons primarily composed of bone tissue. They can be contrasted with the Chondrichthyes, which have skeletons primarily composed of cartilage. The vast majority of fish are members of Osteichthyes, which is an extremely diverse and abundant group consisting of 45 orders, and over 435 families and 28,000 species. It is  the largest class of vertebrates in existence today.
The group Osteichthyes is divided into the ray-finned fish (Actinopterygii) and lobe-finned fish (Sarcopterygii). The oldest known fossils of bony fish are about 425 million years old, which are also transitional fossils, showing a tooth pattern that is in between the tooth rows of sharks and bony fishes. 

Osteichthyes can be compared to Euteleostomi. In paleontology the terms are synonymous.  In ichthyology the difference is that Euteleostomi presents a cladistic view which includes the terrestrial tetrapods that evolved from lobe-finned fish. Until recently, the view of most ichthyologists has been that Osteichthyes were paraphyletic and include only fishes. However, since 2013 widely cited ichthyology papers have been published with phylogenetic trees that treat the Osteichthyes as a clade including tetrapods.

Characteristics

Bony fish are characterized by a relatively stable pattern of cranial bones, rooted, medial insertion of mandibular muscle in the lower jaw. The head and pectoral girdles are covered with large dermal bones. The eyeball is supported by a sclerotic ring of four small bones, but this characteristic has been lost or modified in many modern species. The labyrinth in the inner ear contains large otoliths. The braincase, or neurocranium, is frequently divided into anterior and posterior sections divided by a fissure.

Early bony fish had simple lungs (a pouch on either side of the esophagus) which helped them breathe in low-oxygen water. In many bony fish these have evolved into swim bladders, which help the body create a neutral balance between sinking and floating. (The lungs of amphibians, reptiles, birds, and mammals were inherited from their bony fish ancestors.) They do not have fin spines, but instead support the fin with lepidotrichia (bone fin rays). They also have an operculum, which helps them breathe without having to swim.

Bony fish do not produce placoid scales, instead they consist of three types of scales that do not penetrate the epidermis in the process. The three categories of scales for Osteichthyes which are cosmoid scales, ganoid scales, teleost scales. The teleost scales are also then divided into two subgroups which are the cycloid scales, and the ctenoid scales. All these scales have a base of bone that they all originate from, the only difference is that the teleost scales only have one layer of bone. Ganoid scales have lamellar bone, and vascular bone that lies on top of the lamellar bone, then enamel lies on top of both layers of bone. Cosmoid scales have the same two layers of bone that ganoid scales have expect they gave dentin in-between the enamel and vascular bone and lamellar (vascular and lamellar two subcategories for bone found in scales). All these scales are found underneath the epidermis and do not break the epidermis of the fish. Unlike the placoid scales that poke through the epidermis of the fish.

Classification

Traditionally, Osteichthyes was considered a class, recognised on the presence of a swim bladder, only three pairs of gill arches hidden behind a bony operculum, and a predominately bony skeleton. Under this classification system, Osteichthyes was considered paraphyletic with regard to land vertebrates, as the common ancestor of all osteichthyans includes tetrapods amongst its descendants. While the largest subclass, Actinopterygii (ray-finned fish), is monophyletic, with the inclusion of the smaller sub-class Sarcopterygii, Osteichthyes was regarded as paraphyletic.

This has led to the current cladistic classification which splits the Osteichthyes into two full classes. Under this scheme Osteichthyes is  monophyletic, as it includes the tetrapods making it a synonym of the clade Euteleostomi. Most bony fish belong to the ray-finned fish (Actinopterygii).

Phylogeny
A phylogeny of living Osteichthyes, including the tetrapods, is shown in the cladogram below. Whole-genome duplication took place in the ancestral Osteichthyes.

Biology
All bony fish possess gills. For the majority this is their sole or main means of respiration. Lungfish and other osteichthyan species are capable of respiration through lungs or vascularized swim bladders. Other species can respire through their skin, intestines, and/or stomach.

Osteichthyes are primitively ectothermic (cold blooded), meaning that their body temperature is dependent on that of the water. But some of the larger marine osteichthyids, such as the opah, swordfish and tuna have independently evolved various levels of endothermy. Bony fish can be any type of heterotroph: numerous species of omnivore, carnivore, herbivore, filter-feeder or detritivore are documented.

Some bony fish are hermaphrodites, and a number of species exhibit parthenogenesis. Fertilization is usually external, but can be internal. Development is usually oviparous (egg-laying) but can be ovoviviparous, or viviparous. Although there is usually no parental care after birth, before birth parents may scatter, hide, guard or brood eggs, with sea horses being notable in that the males undergo a form of "pregnancy", brooding eggs deposited in a ventral pouch by a female.

Examples

The longest is the king of herrings, a type of oarfish.

The Beluga sturgeon is the largest species of freshwater bony fish extant today, and Arapaima gigas is among the largest of the freshwater fish. The largest bony fish ever was Leedsichthys, which dwarfed the beluga sturgeon as well as the ocean sunfish, giant grouper and all the other giant bony fishes alive today.

Comparison with cartilaginous fishes
Cartilaginous fishes can be further divided into sharks, rays and chimaeras. In the table below, the comparison is made between sharks and bony fishes. For the further differences with rays, see sharks versus rays.

See also
Ostracoderm - armoured jawless fish.
Prehistoric fish

References

Citations

Bibliography

 
Teleostomi
Pridoli first appearances
Extant Silurian first appearances
Superclasses (biology)